There will be 16 teams that qualify for the men's Olympic football tournament. In addition to host nation Japan, 15 men's national teams will qualify from six separate continental confederations.

Table
Dates and venues are those of final tournaments (or final round of qualification tournaments), various qualification stages may precede matches at these specific venues.

2019 UEFA European Under-21 Championship

Qualified teams

Notes

2019 OFC Men's Olympic Qualifying Tournament

2019 Africa U-23 Cup of Nations

Qualified teams

2020 AFC U-23 Championship

Qualified teams

2020 CONMEBOL Pre-Olympic Tournament

2020 CONCACAF Olympic Qualifying Championship

Qualified teams

References

 
Men